The Stolpersteine in the Pardubický lists the Stolpersteine in the Pardubice Region in the east of Bohemia. Stolpersteine is the German name for stumbling blocks collocated all over Europe by German artist Gunter Demnig. They remember the fate of the Nazi victims being murdered, deported, exiled or driven to suicide.

Generally, the stumbling blocks are posed in front of the building where the victims had their last self chosen residence. The name of the Stolpersteine in Czech is: Kameny zmizelých, stones of the disappeared.

The lists are sortable; the basic order follows the alphabet according to the last name of the victim.

Chrudim 

The Stolpersteine of Chrudim were collocated by Gunter Demnig on 19 September 2017.

Slatiňany 

At the time of the Protectorate of Bohemia and Moravia, 16 people of Jewish faith lived in Slatiňany. The first Jewish victim was Zikmund Klopper, who died in 1939 during an interrogation. The first deportations took place on 15 September 1942, the last one on 5 December 1942. Marie and Rudolf Lengsfeld committed suicide and thus escaped the deportations. Only Max Stránský returned from the concentration camps. A memorial plaque in Slatiňany commemorates 20 people who lost their lives between 1938 and 1945, including 15 Jews.

On 15 August 2018 Gunter Demnig collocated six Stolpersteine in Slatiňany.

Svitavy 
The Stolpersteine in Svitavy were collocated by the artist himself on 15 September 2014.

See also 
 List of cities by country that have stolpersteine
 Stolpersteine in the Czech Republic

External links

 stolpersteine.eu, Demnig's website
 holocaust.cz Czech databank of Holocaust victims
 Yad Vashem, Central Database of Shoah Victims' Names

References

Pardubický kraj